Hoeffding may refer to:

 Wassily Hoeffding , American statistician.
 Harald Høffding, Danish philosopher.
 Finn Høffding, Danish composer.